The 2012–13 season was the 133rd season of competitive football in England.

The season began on 11 August 2012 for the Football Conference and 18 August 2012 for both the Premier League and The Football League. The regular season of the Football Conference season ended on 20 April 2013 followed by League One and League Two both ending on 27 April 2013 whilst The Championship ended on 4 May 2013 and finally the Premier League on 19 May 2013.

Promotion and relegation

Pre season

Post season

New clubs
 AFC Rushden & Diamonds, a new club formed and owned by fans of the defunct Rushden & Diamonds F.C., were accepted into the United Counties League Division One (level 10, Step 6).
 AFC Croydon Athletic, a new club formed and owned by fans of the defunct Croydon Athletic F.C., were accepted into the Combined Counties Football League Division One (level 10, Step 6)

Clubs removed
 Witney Town F.C. from the Hellenic Football League Premier Division (level 9, step 5) were evicted from their ground in early February 2013 for failing to pay the rent. The club subsequently folded due to lack of funds.

England national football team

2014 FIFA World Cup qualification

International Friendlies

League tables

Premier League 

In Sir Alex Ferguson's final season as manager, Manchester United comfortably won their 13th Premier League title and their 20th overall, topping the table in mid-November and never surrendering their lead, though a run of just three wins in their last eight matches meant that they squandered the chance to become the first ever top-flight side to earn a hundred points in a season. Neighbours and defending champions Manchester City finished in second place, though they never looked like seriously challenging for a second successive title, and this, combined with a humiliating FA Cup final defeat by Wigan Athletic, cost Roberto Mancini his job. Despite enduring a turbulent season in which Champions League-winning manager Roberto Di Matteo was dismissed early in the campaign and replaced by the extremely unpopular appointment of former Liverpool boss Rafael Benítez on an interim basis, Chelsea did improve on the previous season's finish by three places and 11 points, and also won the Europa League for the first time in their history. The final Champions League spot was taken by Arsenal; despite being well off the pace for much of the season following the £24 million departure of Robin van Persie in the summer, they managed to snatch fourth place with an excellent late run of form, consigning rivals Tottenham Hotspur to the Europa League once again.

David Moyes ended 11 years in charge of Everton by guiding the Toffees to a solid finish of sixth place, finishing two points ahead of arch rivals Liverpool, who hit the headlines again for all the wrong reasons when striker Luis Suárez received a lengthy ban after biting Chelsea defender Branislav Ivanović during a league game. Swansea City qualified for the Europa League by winning the League Cup, becoming the first Welsh club to qualify for a major European club competition, whilst West Bromwich Albion finished eighth, their best finish in the Premier League era.

West Ham United fared the best out of the three promoted teams, losing just four home games all season and finishing impressively in tenth place, despite repeated speculation that manager Sam Allardyce would be sacked and replaced with a manager with a reputation for a more attractive style of play. Southampton finished four places below them, flirting with relegation all season before Nigel Adkins was sacked and replaced by the relatively unknown Mauricio Pochettino, who guided the Saints to 19 points from their remaining 16 games.

At the bottom of the table, Queens Park Rangers were relegated after a thoroughly dismal campaign in which they recorded the worst start in Premier League history, not winning a league game until December, and with not even Harry Redknapp's appointment as manager and a substantial investment in players during the January transfer window significantly improving their fortunes. Reading, who never quite adjusted to the pace of the top-flight after being promoted as champions the previous year, fared little better and were relegated in second-bottom place. Both Reading and QPR were relegated on the same day after a 0-0 draw against each other. Despite winning the FA Cup (and thereby qualifying for the following season's Europa League), Wigan Athletic finally succumbed to relegation after eight years of battling against the odds in the Premier League.

Leading goalscorer: Robin van Persie (Manchester United) – 26

Championship 

After a decade of trying and play-off heartbreak, Cardiff City finally secured their long-awaited promotion to the Premier League, leading the division for nearly the entire season and being promoted as champions. Hull City finished the season as runners-up under manager Steve Bruce, returning to the top-flight after an absence of three years. This was despite a shaky end to the season which saw them fail to win any of their last four fixtures. Ian Holloway made it two promotions in three attempts as Crystal Palace were promoted through the play-offs, earning a record-breaking fourth promotion to the Premier League. The Eagles' success ensured that they became the first club to win the second-tier play-off final four times, and also the first club to win the play-off final at four separate venues – at home at Selhurst Park in a two-legged final format in 1989, the old Wembley in 1997, the Millennium Stadium in 2004 and the new Wembley in 2013.

Bolton Wanderers fared the best out of the newly relegated clubs and looked good value to secure a play-off place throughout the season, but narrowly missed out after drawing their final game and Leicester's last minute win at Nottingham Forest. Blackburn Rovers in contrast, despite a strong start to the season spent the latter part of it battling relegation, with indifferent spells of form during the season and the presence of three permanent managers seeing them slide towards the bottom 3 before finally pulling away under the caretaker management of Gary Bowyer.

Bristol City, who had been in a gradual downward spiral since failing to win promotion to the Premier League in 2008, were relegated in bottom place after a dismal end to the season. The arrival of Sean O'Driscoll and a run of 5 home victories from 6 failed to save them. Making even bigger headlines were Wolverhampton Wanderers, who suffered their second successive relegation, giving them the unwanted distinction of having suffered successive relegations from the top and second tiers on two separate occasions (the first being in the 1983–84 and 1984–85 seasons). The final relegation spot was filled by Peterborough United, who despite recovering well from seven consecutive losses at the start of the season, ended up being relegated with the joint-highest ever points total for a relegated team.

League table
A total of 24 teams contest the division: 18 sides remaining in the division from last season, three relegated from the Premier League, and three promoted from the League One.

Leading goalscorer: Glenn Murray (Crystal Palace) – 30

League One 

Despite the departure of manager Dean Saunders, Doncaster Rovers made an immediate return to the Championship, winning the title in dramatic fashion on the final day of the season. Bournemouth were promoted as runners-up; they had initially looked set to battle relegation this season following an awful start under previous manager Paul Groves, but the decision to re-employ successful former manager Eddie Howe paid off handsomely, and saw them promoted to the second tier for only the second time in their history, and the first time since 1990. Yeovil Town won promotion through the play-offs, entering the Championship for the first time ever, and also meaning that manager Gary Johnson (who returned for his own second spell late in the previous season) had earned his third promotion with the club, having gotten them promoted from the Football Conference and League Two in 2003 and 2005 respectively. None of the three promoted clubs had ever played in the top flight at the time, be it the old Football League First Division or the current Premier League. The previous time this had happened was in 1979, when Shrewsbury Town, Watford and Swansea City were promoted (the latter two eventually competed in the top flight under both denominations).

Financially stricken Portsmouth finally hit rock-bottom, and were relegated to the Football League's lowest tier for the first time since 1980, just five years after winning the FA Cup, and three years after playing in the Premier League. They were consigned to bottom place after their second ten-point deduction in as many seasons, though unlike the previous season would have been relegated even without the deduction. Hartlepool United were relegated in second-bottom place, mostly due to a dreadful first half of the season which saw them win just once in their first 23 games, bringing an end to what had been the club's longest spell outside the bottom tier. Bury, who suffered their own financial problems and never quite recovered from the loss of manager Richie Barker days before the season began, also suffered relegation, and only finished above Hartlepool on goals scored. Scunthorpe United occupied the final relegation spot, being relegated for the second time in three seasons.

League table
A total of 24 teams contest the division: 17 sides remaining in the division from last season, three relegated from the Championship, and four promoted from League Two.

Leading goalscorer: Paddy Madden (Yeovil Town) – 23

League Two 

Gillingham won the division and returned to League One after a three-year absence, as Martin Allen's appointment as manager brought immediate success. Rotherham United celebrated their return to their hometown (after four years of playing in Sheffield) by winning promotion as runners-up. Port Vale, whose promotion challenge had been derailed by a ten-point administration penalty in the previous season, took the final automatic promotion spot. The play-offs were won by Bradford City, who were victorious in their second Wembley appearance this season (their first being in the League Cup final).

Aldershot Town were relegated back to the Football Conference after five years, experiencing relegation for the first time since the club's formation in 1992. After surviving relegation on the last day for three seasons in a row, Barnet's luck finally ran out (despite their best points total in four years and the high-profile appointment of Edgar Davids as player-manager) and they were relegated from the Football League for the second time.

League table
Twenty-four teams contest the division: 18 sides remaining in the division from last season, four relegated from League One, and two promoted from Conference National.

Leading goalscorer: Tom Pope (Port Vale) – 31

Football Conference (Top Division) 

Promoted as champions of the Football Conference were Mansfield Town, who coincidentally were one of the teams replaced by Aldershot at the end of the 2007–08 season. They were joined by 2013 Conference National play-off Final winners Newport County, who joined the Football League for the first time as the current incarnation of the club (their forerunners last played in the League in 1988). The play-off final between Newport County and Wrexham was the first Wembley Stadium final to feature two Welsh clubs.

AFC Telford United were relegated in bottom place after a terrible run of form which saw them win just one of their last 30 matches, along with getting through four different managers during the course of the season. Ebbsfleet United finished second-bottom amid financial worries caused by the collapse of their MyFootballClub ownership scheme. Barrow occupied third-bottom place, ultimately being cost dearly by their poor goalscoring record. Stockport County were the final relegated side, being relegated to the Conference North just three years after being in League One, and eleven years after being in the second tier.

League table

Managerial changes

Transfers

Diary of the season
 18 August 2012: Swansea City débutant Michu scores the first goal of the Premier League season, as the Swans hit five past QPR on opening day. 
 31 August 2012: August ends with Chelsea looking to make up for their poor form the previous season as they stand top with 9 points from their first three games. Swansea City and Everton are joint second, having won their opening two matches. West Bromwich Albion, Manchester City, Fulham and Manchester United complete the top seven, while QPR, Southampton and Aston Villa prop up the table. In the Championship, Blackpool appear to be unaffected by the previous season's play-off heartbreak and stand top with 9 points from three games; newly promoted Sheffield Wednesday and recently relegated Blackburn Rovers are joint second. Bristol City, Watford and Middlesbrough (joint sixth with Leeds United) make up the play-off places and Birmingham City, Peterborough United and Crystal Palace the relegation zone.
 28 September 2012: Under-fire Blackburn Rovers manager Steve Kean resigns after a turbulent 21 months in charge.
 30 September 2012: Chelsea remain top of the Premier League as September ends, undefeated in six matches and three points ahead of surprise title contenders Everton, in second. The two Manchester clubs, Tottenham Hotspur, West Brom and Arsenal make up the rest of the top seven and Norwich City, Reading and QPR the relegation zone. Brighton, Cardiff City and Wolves are joint top of the Championship, joined by Blackburn, Leicester City and Huddersfield Town in the play-off places. Sheffield Wednesday, who lost all their games in September, have dropped from third to twenty-second, joined in the relegation zone by Ipswich Town and Peterborough.
 9 October 2012: Sheffield Wednesday chairman Milan Mandaric assures Dave Jones that his job is not under threat. Bolton Wanderers sack boss Owen Coyle with the club 18th in the Championship table. Meanwhile, Kettering Town are unable to name a team for their match against Leamington.
 19 October 2012: Sheffield Wednesday goalkeeper Chris Kirkland is assaulted by a Leeds United fan during a derby match at Hillsborough. The incident leads to calls from Dave Jones and certain sections of the press for sanctions against Leeds and their fans, though the FA and Football League both state that they consider this a civil matter. The fan is subsequently apprehended and receives a four-month prison sentence.
 30 October 2012: Arsenal come from 4–0 down to defeat Reading 7–5 after extra time in the fourth round of the League Cup, with Theo Walcott scoring a hat-trick. The other fixtures played on the Tuesday night see several shocks, with Southampton, Wigan and Sunderland all knocked out by lower-league competitors.
 31 October 2012: October ends with Chelsea's lead at the top of the Premiership cut down to one point after a controversial home defeat by Manchester United, who are ahead of third-placed Manchester City on goal difference. Tottenham currently hold the coveted fourth spot, while Everton, Arsenal and Fulham are maintaining their challenge for European football. QPR remain bottom of the Premiership, joined in the bottom three by Southampton and Reading. In the Championship, Cardiff are looking to end a 50-year exile from England's top flight, standing three points clear of Leicester and Middlesbrough. Crystal Palace, Blackburn and Hull City complete the top six. Ipswich, meanwhile, are five points adrift of safety at the foot of the Championship, with 22nd-placed Sheffield Wednesday and 23rd-placed Bristol City putting the pressure on Charlton and Peterborough.
 22 November 2012: Chelsea manager Roberto Di Matteo becomes the first Premier League manager to be sacked after a run of one win in their last eight matches in all competitions culminates in a 3–0 loss at Juventus that leaves Chelsea in peril of becoming the first reigning European champions to be eliminated in the Champions League group stage. Rafael Benítez, who twice masterminded Chelsea's elimination in the Champions League semi-finals at the hands of his former club Liverpool, takes over as interim manager until the end of the season.
 30 November 2012: November ends with Manchester United a point clear at the top of the Premiership, ahead of unbeaten Manchester City. Chelsea have gone November without a win and stand in third, seven points behind United. West Bromwich Albion have won four straight matches in November to stand fourth, behind Chelsea only on goal difference, giving fans hope of a shock title challenge just two seasons after promotion, or at the very least a charge for European qualification. Tottenham, Everton and Arsenal make up the rest of the top seven. The relegation zone remains unchanged from the end of October, although 18th-placed Southampton are piling the pressure on Aston Villa, Sunderland, Wigan and Newcastle. QPR are 8 points adrift in 20th place, although the appointment of Harry Redknapp, who arrived at Tottenham in similar circumstances in 2008 and led them to eighth place that season, has given Rangers fans hopes of an escape. In the Championship, Cardiff continue to top the table, a point ahead of Crystal Palace; Middlesbrough, Leicester, Millwall and Hull complete the top six. Ipswich have responded well to the appointment of Mick McCarthy and are now two points clear of the relegation zone, at the expense of Bristol City, Sheffield Wednesday and Peterborough.
 5 December 2012: Chelsea become the first reigning European champions to be eliminated from the Champions League: in spite of a 6–1 home victory over Danish champions Nordsjælland, Juventus' 1–0 win at Shakhtar Donetsk means that the Italian and Ukrainian champions progress to the first knockout round. Chelsea are demoted to the Europa League.
 31 December 2012: 2012 ends with Manchester United looking well placed to win a record 20th title as they stand seven points clear of second-placed Manchester City. Chelsea are four points behind in third with a game in hand, followed by Tottenham, Arsenal, Everton and West Brom. QPR prop the table at the end of the year, with Reading (who were bottom on Christmas Day) and Southampton also in the relegation zone, although the pressure is being felt by Aston Villa, Wigan, Newcastle and Fulham. Cardiff are five points clear of second-placed Hull City and look safe bets for a return to the top tier. Middlesbrough, Crystal Palace, Leicester City and Watford make up the rest of the top six and Bristol City, Peterborough and Barnsley the bottom three.
 23 January 2013: Swansea City confirm their first appearance in a major Wembley cup final with victory over Chelsea in the semi-final of the Football League Cup. The second leg match is marred however, by a bizarre incident involving Chelsea player Eden Hazard, who was sent off after appearing to kick a ball boy who was lying on top of the ball in an effort to retrieve it quickly. Swansea will play Bradford City who became the first team from the bottom tier of English football to reach a major final since Rochdale in 1962, after knocking Aston Villa, Arsenal and Wigan, all of the Premier League, out of the competition during their run to the final.
 26 January 2013: Luton Town make the headlines by defeating Norwich City in the fourth round of the FA Cup, becoming the first non-league side to reach the fifth round since Sutton United in 1989. Another upset is achieved by League One side MK Dons, who defeat Queens Park Rangers.
 27 January 2013: A week of shock cup results is capped off by a day which sees a series of successively bigger surprises. Firstly, FA Cup holders and European champions Chelsea are left needing a late equaliser to avoid being knocked out by League One side Brentford, setting up a replay at Stamford Bridge. Two hours later, fellow London and Premier League side Tottenham Hotspur are eliminated by Leeds United, once Premier League giants themselves, but currently 11th in the Championship after a decade of minimal on-pitch success. Two hours after that, another Premier League team, Liverpool are knocked out by League One side Oldham Athletic, who like Leeds were founder members of the Premier League but have had little to cheer about in recent years (having been in their current league since 1997, the longest period without promotion or relegation for a club outside the top-flight).
 31 January 2013: January ends with Manchester United seven points clear of second-placed Manchester City, and looking well placed to win a record twentieth title. In spite of Chelsea's relatively mediocre (by their standards) form, the West London club stand four points ahead of fourth-placed Tottenham. Everton stand a point behind Spurs, while Arsenal and Liverpool have not given hopes of Champions League qualification. In the Championship, Cardiff have extended their lead at the top of the Championship to seven points, ahead of Leicester City, although Hull, Watford, Crystal Palace and Middlesbrough are still with a chance of automatic promotion. Peterborough sit at the bottom of the Championship, two points adrift of Bristol City and Barnsley, who are in turn four points adrift of 21st-placed Ipswich.
 24 February 2013: Swansea City win the League Cup final in comprehensive fashion, defeating League Two side Bradford City 5–0, earning the Welsh club their first trophy from within the English league system.
 28 February 2013: The month ends with Manchester United a massive fifteen points (albeit having played a game more) ahead of second-placed Manchester City, with the question on most pundits' minds being not whether United will win the title, but how soon it will be, and whether they will set a new record points total. Despite being well adrift of their neighbours, City themselves have a comfortable five-point gap between them and Tottenham Hotspur, who have taken over third place and are two points in front of Chelsea. At the other end of the table, Queens Park Rangers are six points adrift in bottom place, with Reading second-bottom and Aston Villa a point ahead in third-bottom place, and Wigan Athletic ahead of Villa on goal difference alone. The situation in the Championship is looking a similar procession for the leaders, with Cardiff City eight points ahead of second-placed Watford with a game in hand, though the race for the second automatic spot is much more competitive, with only five points separating Watford from fifth-place Leicester City. Peterborough United and Bristol City are falling further adrift of safety at the bottom, but in a surprise turn of events, Wolverhampton Wanderers are now occupying the last relegation spot following a revival by Barnsley, and are in serious danger of a second successive relegation.
 5 March 2013: Manchester United are eliminated from the Champions League second round in controversial fashion, after Nani is sent off during the second leg of their tie against Real Madrid at Old Trafford for a flying tackle on Álvaro Arbeloa, which most pundits agreed barely even merited a yellow card, much less a red. Following the red card, Real, who had been 2–1 down on aggregate, rally to score two quick goals and win the tie 3–2.
 13 March 2013: Despite a 2–0 victory over Bayern Munich at the Allianz Arena, Arsenal exit the Champions League on the away goals rule. This means that for the first time since the 1995–96 season (and the first time overall since it began admitting more than one team per country), no English team will be in the quarter-finals of the competition.
 19 March 2013: Blackburn Rovers sack Michael Appleton their third permanent manager of the season and fifth manager overall after just 67 days in charge at Ewood Park.
 28 March 2013: League One Coventry City enter administration and are subsequently deducted 10 points. The team drops from tenth to fourteenth as a result.
 31 March 2013: As of Easter Sunday, little has changed in the Premier League; Manchester United are still fifteen points clear of neighbours Manchester City, who no longer even have the game in hand that they did a month previously. City in turn remain five points clear of Tottenham Hotspur, who are a further two points ahead of Chelsea. However, Arsenal and Everton are now starting to close in on the top four, being just two and four points behind Chelsea respectively. At the bottom, Reading have fallen to the foot of the table after a horrible month, and Queens Park Rangers have moved off the bottom on goal difference, though both teams are still a massive seven points away from safety. Aston Villa are still behind Wigan on goal difference, though Wigan can go above Sunderland by winning their game in hand. In the Championship, Cardiff City's lead has been pegged back to four points, while Hull City have broken clear of the rest of the chasing pack, being four points ahead of third-placed Watford, who along with Crystal Palace look to be the only teams with any hope of catching the top two. Bristol City have fallen adrift at the bottom of the division and are looking increasingly doomed, but a revival in form has seen Peterborough United leap out of the relegation zone at the expense of Barnsley, with Wolverhampton Wanderers also still in the bottom three. Doncaster Rovers are heading up an incredibly competitive race for promotion from League One, with just four points separating them from fifth-placed Sheffield United (who are arguably the best-placed club in this race, having played two games fewer than any of their rivals). In League Two, Gillingham have a six-point lead, with Port Vale and Northampton Town (who both have games in hand) occupying second and third place. York City and Aldershot are three and four points from safety at the bottom of League Two.
 6 April 2013: Gillingham beat struggling Torquay to seal automatic promotion to League 1.
 7 April 2013: Crewe Alexandra beat Southend United to win the Johnstone's Paint Trophy.
 13 April 2013: Bury are relegated to League 2 following a 1–0 defeat by Oldham Athletic.
 16 April: Cardiff City are promoted to the top flight of English football for the first time in 51 years following a draw against Charlton Athletic. At the same time, Bristol City are relegated to League One following their defeat by Birmingham City. Meanwhile, Portsmouth and Hartlepool are relegated to League Two following Oldham's victory over Yeovil.
 20 April 2013: Cardiff City and Gillingham secure the titles for the Championship and League Two respectively, while Bournemouth win promotion from League One, and Port Vale virtually assure promotion from League Two, barring an infeasibly large defeat in their final match of the season. In the Conference National, Mansfield Town end their five-year exile from the Football League, while Stockport County are relegated to the Conference North, just three years after they were playing in League One, and eleven years after playing in what is now the Championship. On top of that, their match against Conference runners-up Kidderminster Harriers is disrupted by a pitch invasion early in the second half.
 22 April 2013: Manchester United clinch a record 20th title by beating Aston Villa 3–0.
 27 April 2013: The last day of the season in League One and League Two. Doncaster Rovers defeat Brentford with a last minute goal to become promoted as champions of the League One title, with Bournemouth the runners-up after being held 0–0 at Tranmere. Scunthorpe United are relegated to League Two despite winning 3–1 against Swindon, while rivals Colchester United stay up after winning 2–0 at Carlisle United. In League Two, Rotherham United are promoted to League One after winning 2–0 against Aldershot Town, who are relegated as a result. Joining them in the fifth tier of English Football were Barnet after they lost the same score line at Northampton Town, while AFC Wimbledon and York City stay up with their wins. York's win at Dagenham & Redbridge means that Dagenham finish the season on level points with Barnet but they survive on goal difference.
 28 April 2013: Queens Park Rangers and Reading are relegated from the Premier League to the Championship following a draw between the sides.
 30 April 2013: As the season draws to its conclusion, Manchester United have secured their title, but their hopes of setting a new records points total have been ended by dropping points in three of their matches this month. Manchester City are looking a solid bet to finish runners-up, being six points ahead of Chelsea, who have taken over third place. Arsenal are occupying the fourth Champions League spot, and Tottenham Hotspur have dropped into fifth place, though have a game in hand over Arsenal. Everton are not entirely out of the European race, but face a tall order to catch the leading pack. At the bottom, Reading and QPR are both doomed to the drop, with QPR being ahead of Reading by virtue of just a single goal. Wigan Athletic have fallen into the relegation zone following a terrible month, and are five points behind a clutch of sides including Newcastle United, Aston Villa and Sunderland, though do have a game in hand over that trio. With one round of matches to go in the Championship, Cardiff City have already sealed top spot, and Hull City remain ahead of Watford in second place, but by just one point and with a far worse goal difference. Brighton have sealed fourth place and a play-off spot, and Crystal Palace are also looking almost certain to qualify for the play-offs. Bolton Wanderers occupy the final play-off place by virtue of a better goal difference than Nottingham Forest, and Leicester City are also in with a chance. At the other end of the table, Bristol City are ten points adrift and long-since relegated, and Wolverhampton Wanderers are also looking likely to suffer their second successive relegation, barring a highly unlikely set of results on the final day. Barnsley are in the final relegation spot, though any of the four sides above them could still be dragged down into League One.
 4 May 2013: On the final day of the Championship season, Hull City are promoted to the Premier League while Wolverhampton Wanderers become the first team to be relegated from the top flight to the third tier of English football in successive seasons. They are joined in League One by Peterborough United following their last minute defeat by Crystal Palace, replacing Barnsley who stay up despite being held to a draw at rivals Huddersfield Town, who too survive. Peterborough's defeat means that Crystal Palace automatically take a play-off place along with Leicester City, following their late 3–2 win at rivals Nottingham Forest, who miss out.
 5 May 2013: Newport County win the all-Welsh Conference play-off Final against Wrexham thus gaining promotion to the Football League after 25 years away.
 8 May 2013: Manchester United manager Alex Ferguson announces that he will retire when the current season ends, after nearly 27 years in charge of the club.
 11 May 2013: Wigan Athletic beat Manchester City 1–0 to win the FA Cup for the first time.
 13 May 2013: Norwich City beat Chelsea 3–2 in the second leg of the FA Youth Cup Final winning the tie 4–2 on aggregate. The first time the Canaries have won the cup for 30 years.
 14 May 2013: Three days after winning the FA Cup Wigan Athletic lose 4–1 at Arsenal and are relegated to The Championship after an eight-year stay in the Premier League. It is the first time that the FA Cup winners are relegated from the top flight in the same season.
15 May 2013: Chelsea become the first English club to win all three European club competitions with a 2–1 victory over Benfica in the 2013 Europa League Final in Amsterdam.
18 May 2013: Bradford City are promoted to League One following their 3–0 win over Northampton Town in the league Two play-off final. 
19 May 2013: Alex Ferguson's conclusion as manager of Manchester United ended in style with a dramatic 5–5 draw at West Bromwich Albion while Arsenal win 1–0 at Newcastle United to take fourth spot over rivals Tottenham Hotspur, who miss out despite winning the same score line against Sunderland. Elsewhere, Yeovil are promoted to the Championship following their 2–1 win over Brentford. It will be the first time that Yeovil have reached that level in the football league.
27 May 2013: Crystal Palace are promoted to the Premier League following their 1–0 extra time win over rivals Watford in the 2013 Football League Championship play-off Final.

Welsh success
The 2012–13 season was one of particular success for Welsh clubs playing in the English league system. Swansea City of the Premier League became the first Welsh club to win the Football League Cup; Cardiff City gained promotion to the Premier League by winning the Football League Championship; Newport County and Wrexham reached the final of the Football Conference play-offs, with Newport winning to gain promotion to the Football League, while Wrexham gained a measure of consolation by winning the FA Trophy.

Deaths

 7 July 2012: Jimmy Tansey, 83, former Everton and Crewe Alexandra defender.
 11 July 2012: Joe McBride, 74, former Scotland and Luton Town striker.
 11 July 2012: Bobby Nicol, 76, former Barnsley wing half.
 12 July 2012: Eddy Brown, 86, former Preston North End, Southampton, Coventry City, Birmingham City, Leyton Orient and Scarborough forward.
 22 July 2012: Eric Bell, 82, former Bolton Wanderers wing half who scored for Wanderers in the 1953 FA Cup Final against Blackpool despite being injured for most of the game.
 23 July 2012: Ernie Machin, 68, former Coventry City, Plymouth Argyle and Brighton & Hove Albion midfielder.
 27 July 2012: Jack Taylor, 82, Wolverhampton born referee who refereed the 1974 World Cup final between West Germany and the Netherlands.
 30 July 2012: Les Green, 70, former Hartlepool United, Rochdale and Derby County goalkeeper.
 16 August 2012: Phil Kelly, 73, former Republic of Ireland, Wolverhampton Wanderers and Norwich City full back.
 20 August 2012: Len Quested, 87, former Fulham and Huddersfield Town full back or midfielder.
 9 September 2012: Ron Tindall, 76, former Chelsea, West Ham United, Reading and Portsmouth striker.
 12 September 2012: Jimmy Andrews, 85, former West Ham United, Leyton Orient and Queens Park Rangers winger, who also had four years as manager of Cardiff City.
 14 September 2012: Frank Dudley, 87, former Southend United, Leeds United, Southampton, Cardiff City and Brentford forward.
 26 September 2012: John Bond, 79, former West Ham United & Torquay United right-back, who was also known for his time as a manager with the likes of Bournemouth, Norwich City, Manchester City, Burnley, Swansea City, Birmingham City and Shrewsbury Town.
 3 October 2012: Albie Roles, 91, former Southampton full back.
 15 October 2012: Jim Rollo, 74, former Oldham Athletic, Southport and Bradford City goalkeeper.
 17 October 2012: Milija Aleksic, 61, former Tottenham Hotspur goalkeeper who kept goal for the club in their FA Cup triumph of 1981. Also served Plymouth Argyle and Luton Town in the Football League.
 18 October 2012: Iain Jamieson, 84, former Coventry City player and chairman.
 24 October 2012: Peter Wright, 78, former Colchester United winger.
 25 October 2012: John Connelly, 74, former England, Burnley, Manchester United, Blackburn Rovers and Bury outside forward.
 4 November 2012: Reg Pickett, 85, former Portsmouth and Ipswich Town wing half.
 5 November 2012: Jimmy Stephen, 90, former Scotland, Bradford Park Avenue and Portsmouth defender.
 6 November 2012: Ivor Powell, 96, former Wales, Queens Park Rangers, Aston Villa, Port Vale and Bradford City wing half who also went into management with Port Vale, Bradford City and Carlisle United amongst others.
 7 November 2012: Harry McShane, 92, former Blackburn Rovers, Huddersfield Town, Bolton Wanderers, Manchester United and Oldham Athletic outside left.
 8 November 2012: Bobby Gilfillan, 74, former Newcastle United, Southend United and Doncaster Rovers forward.
 14 November 2012: Eric Day, 91, former Southampton winger.
 14 November 2012: Keith Ripley, 77, former Leeds United, Norwich City, Mansfield Town, Peterborough United and Doncaster Rovers forward.
 18 November 2012: Kenny Morgans, 73, former Manchester United, Swansea City and Newport County outside right and survivor of the Munich air disaster in 1958.
 20 November 2012: Gary Ingham, 48, former Doncaster Rovers goalkeeper.
 25 November 2012: Dave Sexton, 82, former Luton Town, West Ham United, Leyton Orient, Brighton & Hove Albion and Crystal Palace inside forward who had spells in management with Leyton Orient, Chelsea, Queens Park Rangers, Manchester United, England U21 and Coventry City.
 25 November 2012: Bert Linnecor, 78, former Birmingham City and Lincoln City wing half.
 1 December 2012: Mitchell Cole, 27, former Southend United, Stevenage and Oxford United midfielder.
 1 December 2012: Phil Taylor, 95, former England, Bristol Rovers and Liverpool wing half who also had a three-year spell in charge at Liverpool.
 1 December 2012:  Steve Fox, 54, former Birmingham City, Wrexham, Port Vale and Chester City winger.
 13 December 2012: Ian Black, 88, former Scotland, Southampton and Fulham goalkeeper.
 18 December 2012: George Showell, 78, former Wolverhampton Wanderers, Bristol City and Wrexham defender.
 20 December 2012: Dennis Stevens, 79, former Bolton Wanderers, Everton, Oldham Athletic and Tranmere Rovers inside forward.
 20 December 2012: Stan Charlton, 83, former Leyton Orient and Arsenal right back.
 21 December 2012: George Hazlett, 89, former Bury, Cardiff City and Millwall outside right.
 28 December 2012: Tommy Keane, 44, former Bournemouth and Colchester United midfielder.
 4 January 2013: Derek Kevan, 77, former England, Bradford Park Avenue, West Bromwich Albion, Chelsea, Manchester City, Crystal Palace, Peterborough United, Luton Town and Stockport County centre forward.
 9 January 2013: Harold Searson, 88, former Leeds United, Sheffield Wednesday, Mansfield Town and York City goalkeeper.
 13 January 2013: Geoff Thomas, 64, former Swansea City midfielder
 18 January 2013: Ian Wells, 48, former Hereford United forward.
 23 January 2013: Jimmy Payne, 86, former Liverpool and Everton winger.
 24 January 2013: Dave Harper, 74, former Millwall, Ipswich Town, Swindon Town and Orient midfielder.
 29 January 2013: Reg Jenkins, 74, former Plymouth Argyle, Exeter City, Torquay United and Rochdale inside forward.
 8 February 2013: Ron Hansell, 82, former Norwich City and Chester City inside forward.
 10 February 2013: Bill Roost, 88, former Bristol Rovers and Swindon Town inside forward.
 12 February 2013: Bill Bell, 81, former chairman of Port Vale (1987–2002).
 21 February 2013: Dick Neal, Jr., 79, former Lincoln City, Birmingham City and Middlesbrough wing half.
 24 February 2013: Con Martin, 89, former FAI, IFA, Leeds United and Aston Villa utility player.
 28 February 2013: Seamus O'Connell, 83, former Middlesbrough, Chelsea and Carlisle United forward.
 2 March 2013: Jimmy Jackson, 81, former Notts County striker.
 4 March 2013: George Petherbridge, 85, former Bristol Rovers winger.
 6 March 2013: Dave Bewley, 92, former Fulham, Reading and Watford full back.
 6 March 2013: Dick Graham, 90, former Crystal Palace goalkeeper who also managed Palace, Leyton Orient, Walsall, Colchester United and Wimbledon.
 7 March 2013: Stan Keery, 81, former Shrewsbury Town, Newcastle United, Mansfield Town and Crewe Alexandra wing half.
 14 March 2013: Harry Thomson, 72, former Burnley, Blackpool and Barrow goalkeeper.
 24 March 2013: Derek Leaver, 82, former Blackburn Rovers, A.F.C. Bournemouth and Crewe Alexandra midfielder.
 2 April 2013: Barry Mealand, 70, former Fulham and Rotherham United right back.
 6 April 2013: Bill Guttridge, 82, former Wolverhampton Wanderers and Walsall left back.
 12 April 2013: Dennis John, 78, former Plymouth Argyle, Swansea Town, Scunthorpe United and Millwall defender.
 17 April 2013: Paul Ware, 42, former Cardiff City, Macclesfield Town, Nuneaton Borough, Rochdale, Stockport County and Stoke City midfielder.
 22 April 2013: Mike Smith, 77, former Derby County and Bradford City centre half.
 23 April 2013: Tony Grealish, 56, former Republic of Ireland, Leyton Orient, Luton Town, Brighton & Hove Albion, West Bromwich Albion, Manchester City, Rotherham United and Walsall defender.
 April 2013: Ralph "Ginger" Johnson, 91, former Norwich City player and scorer of the fastest goal for the Canaries at Carrow Road.
 29 April 2013: Kevin Moore, 55, former Grimsby Town, Oldham Athletic, Southampton and Fulham defender.
 5 May 2013: Alan Arnell, 79, former Liverpool, Tranmere Rovers and Halifax Town striker.
 6 May 2013: Steve Carney, 55, former Newcastle United, Darlington and Hartlepool United defender.
 22 May 2013: Brian Greenhoff, 60, former England, Manchester United, Leeds United and Rochdale midfielder.
24 May 2013: Ron Davies, 70, former Wales, Luton, Norwich, Southampton, Portsmouth and Manchester United striker.

Retirements

 19 July 2012: Ledley King, 31, former England and Tottenham Hotspur defender.
 25 July 2012: Chris Morgan, 34, former Barnsley and Sheffield United defender.
 28 July 2012: Andriy Shevchenko, 35, former Ukraine and Chelsea striker.
 30 July 2012: Ben Burgess, 30, former Blackburn Rovers, Stockport County, Hull City, Blackpool and Notts County striker.
 15 August 2012: Fabrice Muamba, 24, former England U21, Arsenal, Birmingham City and Bolton Wanderers midfielder.
 11 September 2012: Adam Miller, 30, former Queens Park Rangers and Gillingham midfielder.
 25 September 2012: Sean Davis, 33, former Fulham, Tottenham Hotspur, Portsmouth, Bolton Wanderers, Bristol City and England under 21 midfielder.
 1 October 2012: Jimmy Bullard, 33, former Peterborough United, Wigan Athletic, Fulham, Hull City, Ipswich Town and MK Dons midfielder.
 2 October 2012: Michael Ballack, 36, former Germany and Chelsea midfielder.
 7 October 2012: Lewis Haldane, 27, former Bristol Rovers, Port Vale and Wales under-21 winger.
 6 November 2012: Wayne Hatswell, 37, former Oxford United, Kidderminster Harriers and Rushden & Diamonds defender.
 24 November 2012: Henrik Pedersen, 37, former Denmark, Bolton Wanderers and Hull City striker/defender.
 6 December 2012: Zdeněk Grygera, 32, former Czech Republic and Fulham defender.
 8 December 2012: Kevin Kilbane, 35, former Republic of Ireland, Preston North End, West Bromwich Albion, Sunderland, Everton, Wigan Athletic, Hull City, Huddersfield Town and Coventry City midfielder.
 1 January 2013: Leon McKenzie, 34, former Crystal Palace, Peterborough United, Norwich City, Coventry City, Charlton Athletic and Northampton Town forward.
 7 February 2013: Jamie Carragher, 35, former England and Liverpool defender.
 3 April 2013: Mark Allott, 36, former Oldham Athletic and Chesterfield midfielder
 4 April 2013: Gareth Owen, 30, former Stoke City, Oldham Athletic, Stockport County, and Port Vale defender.
 5 April 2013: David Hibbert, 27, former Port Vale, Preston North End, Shrewsbury Town and Peterborough United forward.
 27 April 2013: Jack Lester, 37, former Grimsby Town, Nottingham Forest, Sheffield United and Chesterfield forward.
 27 April 2013: Gareth Ainsworth, 39, former Preston North End, Cambridge United, Lincoln City, Port Vale, Wimbledon, Cardiff City, Queens Park Rangers and Wycombe Wanderers midfielder.
 30 April 2013: John Thompson, 31, former Republic of Ireland, Nottingham Forest, Oldham Athletic and Notts County defender.
 3 May 2013: Stephen Carr, 36, former Republic of Ireland, Tottenham Hotspur, Newcastle United and Birmingham City right back.
 3 May 2013: Steve Fletcher, 40. former Hartlepool United and Chesterfield, striker most noted for his two spells at Bournemouth.
 9 May 2013: Stiliyan Petrov, 33, former Bulgaria and Aston Villa midfielder.
 17 May 2013: Jody Craddock, 37, former Cambridge United, Sunderland and Wolverhampton Wanderers defender.
 26 May 2013: David Beckham, 38, former England captain and Manchester United midfielder.
 19 May 2013: Michael Owen, 33, former England, Liverpool, Newcastle United, Manchester United and Stoke City forward.
 19 May 2013: Paul Scholes, 38, former England and Manchester United midfielder.
 23 May 2013: Clarke Carlisle, 33, PFA union chairman and former Blackpool, Queens Park Rangers, Leeds United, Watford, Burnley, York City and Northampton Town defender.

References

 
Seasons in English football